The This Is Why Tour is the ongoing fifth concert tour by American  rock band Paramore, in support of their sixth studio album This Is Why (2023). The tour began on October 2, 2022 in Bakersfield, California, before the release of the album, with several shows throughout North America, Europe, and Latin America. Bloc Party, Foals, The Linda Lindas, Genesis Owusu and Claud served as supporting acts on the tour.

Background and development 
In May 2017, Paramore released their fifth studio album After Laughter to critical acclaim. The album saw the return of former drummer Zac Farro, who had left the band in 2010. The band toured in support of the album from June 2017 until September 2018.  Following the conclusion of the After Laughter Tour, the members of Paramore took a break from writing and recording music for the band and worked on other endeavors. Hayley Williams featured on the American Football song "Uncomfortably Numb" in 2019 and released two solo albums, Petals for Armor (2020) and Flowers for Vases / Descansos (2021); the former produced by Paramore guitarist Taylor York. She also pivoted her attention more towards her hair dye company Good Dye Young and hosted the weekly BBC Sounds series Everything Is Emo. Farro continued his ongoing project HalfNoise, releasing an extended play – Flowerss (2018) – and two albums – Natural Disguise (2019) and Motif (2021). Farro also recorded drums for the songs "Watch Me While I Bloom" and "Crystal Clear" from Williams' Petals for Armor and released an EP under his own name titled Zafari (2020).

Discussion about a sixth Paramore album began in 2020 while Williams was promoting Petals for Armor. Williams hinted that the band's next album would be more guitar-driven, stating, "We've found ourselves listening to a lot of older music that we grew up being inspired by." She further commented on the sound of the album in 2022, likening it to Bloc Party: “From day one, Bloc Party was the number one reference because there was such an urgency to their sound that was different to the fast punk or the pop punk or the like, loud wall of sound emo bands that were happening in the early 2000s.” In January 2022, the band confirmed they had entered the studio work on their sixth album.

In September 2022, Paramore archived all posts on their official Instagram page and unveiled a new design for the website. The site featured a timeline of several dates throughout the month that would be updated each date. These dates saw the launch of the band's official Discord server, the announcement of new tour dates in Los Angeles and New York City, and video snippets of the band working on new material. On September 16, the band announced their first new single in four years, "This Is Why", which was released on September 28. The same day as the single's release, the band announced the album of the same name to be released on February 10, 2023.

Following the release of the lead single off their new album, Paramore announced the first leg of the This Is Why Tour, which would began in October, 2022, a few months before the release of the album. The announced dates included limited U.S. theater performances and headlining slots at the Austin City Limits and When We Were Young festivals.  In October 10, 2022, the band announced a South American leg of the tour, which is set to begin in March 2023. A month later, Paramore announced a 26-city arena tour for the United States in 2023, with Bloc Party, Foals, The Linda Lindas and Genesis Owusu joining them as supporting acts.

Critical reception
Rolling Stone Brittany Spanos gave the tour a positive review, saying it "proved that the best is yet to come" for the band.

Setlists
{{hidden
| headercss = background: #ccccff; font-size: 100%; width: 59%;
| contentcss = text-align: left; font-size: 100%; width: 75%;
| header = North America leg (October 2, 2022 – November 25, 2022)
| content =
"This Is Why"
"Brick By Boring Brick"
"Decode"
"Caught in the Middle"
"That's What You Get"
"Ignorance"
"Forgiveness"
"I Caught Myself"
"Pool"
"Misguided Ghosts" 
"Simmer" (Hayley Williams song)
"Ain't It Fun"
 "Boogie Juice" (HalfNoise song)
"Rose-Colored Boy" (contains elements of "I Wanna Dance With Somebody (Who Loves Me)" by Whitney Houston and "Genius of Love" by Tom Tom Club)
"Told You So"
"Misery Business"
Encore
   "Still Into You" 
 "Hard Times" (contains elements of "Heart of Glass" by Blondie)

}}

{{hidden
| headercss = background: #ccccff; font-size: 100%; width: 59%;
| contentcss = text-align: left; font-size: 100%; width: 75%;
| header = North America leg (February, 2023) 
| content =
"This Is Why"
"C'est Comme Ça"
"That's What You Get"
"Decode"
"Pool"
 "Hard Times" (contains elements of "Heart of Glass" by Blondie)
 "Still Into You" 
"Rose-Colored Boy" (contains elements of "I Wanna Dance With Somebody (Who Loves Me)" by Whitney Houston and "Genius of Love" by Tom Tom Club)
"Brick By Boring Brick"
"I Caught Myself"
"In the Mourning" (contains elements of "Landslide" by Fleetwood Mac)
"You Ain't Woman Enough (To Take My Man)
 "Boogie Juice" (HalfNoise song)
"Told You So"
"The News"
"Ain't It Fun"
Encore
   "Caught In the Middle"
 "Running Out of Time"
"Misery Business" (contains elements of "WAP" by Cardi B and Megan Thee Stallion)

}}

{{hidden
| headercss = background: #ccccff; font-size: 100%; width: 59%;
| contentcss = text-align: left; font-size: 100%; width: 75%;
| header = South America leg (March, 2023) 
| content =
"You First"
"Playing God"
"Decode"
"Pool"
"Running Out of Time"
"Rose-Colored Boy" (contains elements of "I Wanna Dance With Somebody (Who Loves Me)" by Whitney Houston and "Genius of Love" by Tom Tom Club)
"Told You So"
"C'est Comme Ça"
"I Caught Myself"
"The Only Exception"
"(One of Those) Crazy Girls"
"The News"
"That's What You Get"
 "Scooby's in the Back" (HalfNoise song)
 "Hard Times" (contains elements of "Heart of Glass" by Blondie)
"Ain't It Fun"
"All I Wanted"
Encore
   "Still Into You"
"Misery Business"
"This Is Why" 

}}

Shows

Cancelled shows

Notes

References

Paramore concert tours
2022 concert tours
2023 concert tours